Meeks Cabin Dam (National ID # WY01390) is a dam on the Blacks Fork of the Green River, located in Uinta County, southwestern Wyoming. It impounds Meeks Cabin Reservoir, which is mostly in Wyoming, with a portion extending south over the state line into Utah.

Dam
The earthen dam was constructed from 1966 through 1971 by the United States Bureau of Reclamation, with a height of 185 feet and 3162 feet long at its crest. It is primarily for irrigation water storage.

The dam is owned by the Bureau of Reclamation, part of their larger regional Lyman Project, and is operated by the Bridger Valley Water Conservancy District.

Meeks Cabin Reservoir
The Meeks Cabin Reservoir has a surface area of 470 acres and a maximum capacity of 32,470 acre-feet.

Recreation at the reservoir includes fishing (for cutthroat trout and whitefish), camping, hiking, hunting, and boating. It is within the Wasatch-Cache National Forest, under the jurisdiction of the United States Forest Service .

References 

Dams in Wyoming
Dams in the Green River (Colorado River tributary) basin
Earth-filled dams
Buildings and structures in Uinta County, Wyoming
United States Bureau of Reclamation dams
Features of the Uinta Mountains
Wasatch-Cache National Forest
Dams completed in 1971
Lakes of Daggett County, Utah

Bodies of water of Uinta County, Wyoming
Reservoirs in Wyoming
Reservoirs in Utah